Spicamycin is an antibiotic with the molecular formula C30H51N7O7 which is produced by the bacterium Streptomyces alanosinicus. Spicamycin also shows antitumor activity.

References

Further reading 

 
 

Antibiotics
Purines
Amides
Heptoses